Lukáš Hlavatý (born 16 March 1983) is a Czech football midfielder. He played in the Gambrinus liga for 1. FC Brno. He also played international football at under-21 level for Czech Republic U21.

References

External links

1983 births
Living people
Czech footballers
Czech Republic under-21 international footballers
Czech First League players
FC Zbrojovka Brno players
MFK Vítkovice players

Association football midfielders